John McGlynn (born 8 September 1953) is a Scottish actor and musician. His roles include that of vet Calum Buchanan in the British television series All Creatures Great and Small between January 1988 and September 1989.  He also featured as DI Tom Adams in the BBC crime thriller series Silent Witness in series 1, 1996, amongst many other TV Film and theatre roles.

He played Balmoral Castle's head gillie in the 2006 film The Queen.

McGlynn's debut as a professional actor was in 1975 at the Young Lyceum Theatre in Edinburgh, Scotland, in a new play, If Ye Died wi'a Face Like That, by Glaswegian writer William Grant. He was already working with the company as a drummer, contributing to the pre-recorded soundtrack for the above production. He remained with the company for the next two years, performing as an actor, drummer and singer in Cry Wolf, The Water Babies, A Midsummer Night's Dream and Under Milk Wood. He also worked as a singer/drummer/actor with the Scottish 7:84 Company in My Pal and Me and The Trembling Giant, both written by John McGrath. After 7:84 ceased operations, McGlynn was engaged by the Wildcat Theatre Company, which emerged from it, in His Master's Voice and The Complete History of Rock'n'Roll.

Filmography

External links
 

Scottish male television actors
Scottish male film actors
1953 births
Living people